John Tottenham may refer to:
 John Tottenham, 9th Marquess of Ely, Canadian-British peer
 Sir John Tottenham, 1st Baronet, Anglo-Irish politician